Don (Donald) Blackman (September 1, 1953 – April 11, 2013) was an American jazz-funk pianist, singer, and songwriter. He performed with Parliament-Funkadelic; Earth, Wind and Fire; Louis Hayes; and Nicolas Dietz.

Biography
Blackman was born and raised in Jamaica, Queens, NY. A childhood neighbor was Charles McPherson, and while still a teenager he played in McPherson's ensemble with Sam Jones and Louis Hayes. At the beginning of the 1970s, he played with Parliament/Funkadelic, Earth, Wind and Fire, and Roy Ayers, before becoming a member of Lenny White's group Twennynine, for whom he penned songs such as "Peanut Butter" and "Morning Sunrise". He released his self-titled debut solo album in 1982 on Arista Records, including the songs "Holding You, Loving You", "Heart's Desire" and "Since You've Been Away So Long" that became minor hits in Europe.

Blackman also worked as a session musician, appearing on albums by Kurtis Blow (Kingdom Blow), Bernard Wright, Najee, David Sanborn, Lenny White, Roy Ayers, Sting (Brand New Day), World Saxophone Quartet, Janet Jackson's "That's the Way Love Goes" (Remix) and Wayman Tisdale. He wrote the composition "Haboglabotribin", which appeared on Bernard Wright's album Nard and was sampled by Snoop Dogg in the song "G'z and Hustlaz", Tupac Shakur's album R U Still Down? (Remember Me), and is a featured song in the video game Grand Theft Auto V. Other performances include lead vocals on "Morning Sunrise", written by Weldon Irvine, which was sampled on the track "Dear Summer" for Memphis Bleek's album 534 featuring Jay-Z, and "Holding You, Loving You", which appeared on Master P.'s album I Got The Hook Up. 

On television, he scored and wrote music for commercials, TV shows, and movies, appearing on Fox Network's New York Undercover, producing and writing the theme song for Nickelodeon's show "Gullah Gullah Island", as well as producing songs for the MTV Network movie Joe's Apartment.

Death
Don Blackman died, aged 59, from cancer, on April 11, 2013. Blackman is survived by his son Kyle Blackman, who is a DJ in New York, NY, and daughter, jazz-funk singer Irene Blackman, who toured with Blackman throughout the years.

Discography
Don Blackman (Arista Records, 1982)
Listen (Expansion UK, 2002)
With C. I. Williams
When Alto Was King (Mapleshade, 1997)

With Lenny White
Presents The Adventures Of Astral Pirates (Elektra – 6E-121, 1978)
Streamline (Elektra – 6E-164, 1978)

References

Sources
[ Don Blackman] at Allmusic

External links
 – official site

Don Blackman – notice of death

1953 births
People from Jamaica, Queens
American funk musicians
American jazz pianists
American male pianists
American session musicians
2013 deaths
GRP Records artists
Musicians from Queens, New York
Deaths from cancer in New York (state)
20th-century American pianists
Jazz musicians from New York (state)
20th-century American male musicians
American male jazz musicians